Mabel Wellington Jack (1899–1975) was an American printmaker. Many of her prints were published by the New York City Federal Art Project (WPA/FAP). Her work is included in the collections of the Baltimore Museum of Art, the Smithsonian American Art Museum, the Metropolitan Museum of Art, the National Gallery of Art, Washington and the Princeton University Art Museum.

Gallery

References

External links
 

1899 births
1975 deaths
20th-century American printmakers
20th-century American women artists
Artists from New York City
Federal Art Project artists